Hedgemon Lewis (February 25, 1946 – March 31, 2020) was an American professional boxer and trainer. He held the NYSAC welterweight world title in 1972 and challenged for welterweight world championships on three occasions; the unified WBA, and WBC titles twice in 1971 and 1974; and the WBC title in 1976. As an amateur, he won the National Golden Gloves lightweight title in 1964 and the welterweight title in 1966.

Professional career

Lewis was initially taken under the wing of Detroit-based coach Luther Burgess, who presided over his formative boxing years and was later trained by Eddie Futch. Due to Lewis’s exciting style, he soon attracted the attention of Hollywood. His management company consisted of actors and entertainment stars such as Ryan O'Neal, Bill Cosby and Robert Goulet.

Racing through the early part of his career, Lewis was victorious in his first 22 fights. He fought out of Detroit initially, before basing himself in Los Angeles. Establishing himself as one of boxing’s top prospects, Lewis was poised to take on his biggest fight to date, against Ernie ‘Indian Red’ Lopez.  In the first 4 rounds, Lewis outclassed his opponent, before Lopez came from behind to win.

Lewis bounced back to win his next five fights, including defeating highly rated contender Oscar "Shotgun" Albarado over ten rounds. This set the stage for a rematch against former foe Ernie Lopez. In a closely fought and exciting contest, Lewis picked up the decision, flooring his opponent in round 4.

Fighting for the world title

Embarking on a succession of impressive wins, Lewis improved his record to 40-3. In December 1971, Lewis took on Cuban fighter Jose Napoles for the WBC and WBA World Welterweight titles. The bout was tightly contested, with Lewis pushing the world champion for the full 15 rounds. The decision went to Napoles, but all 3 judges scorecards registered a very close fight. Still at a relatively young age of 25, Lewis returned to winning ways, racking up 11 straight wins on the bounce. This included a doubleheader against former world champion Billy Backus.

Lewis traveled to Syracuse, New York, the home town of Backus, for the first bout in June 1972. In what turned out to be one of the fights of the year, Lewis dropped his rival in round 4 on his way to a decision victory. In the rematch, later on, that year, Lewis would once again claim victory. In defeating Backus, Lewis picked up the New York version of the World Welterweight title. He also gained the admiration of the New York boxing scene. Continuing on with varying degrees of success, Lewis would fight twice more for the world title, including a rematch against Jose Napoles, without success. Hedgemon Lewis retired in 1976 at the age of 30. His final career record read 53-7-2. Lewis was inducted into the California Boxing Hall of Fame in 2006.

Post professional boxing career

Not yet finished with the sport, Lewis became a noted coach and cornerman in the world of boxing. He worked the corners with legendary figures such as Eddie Futch, Thell Torrence and Freddy Roach. He would play a key role as part of Futch’s camp in the epic ‘Thriller in Manila’ fight. Lewis trained fighters until his death. Outside of boxing, he also achieved success in the Los Angeles real estate market. Lewis also appeared as a craps gambler in the Ryan O'Neal 1985 movie, Fever Pitch. He died on March 31, 2020 at the age of 74.

Professional boxing record

References

External links 

|-

1946 births
2020 deaths
Welterweight boxers
Boxers from Alabama
People from Greensboro, Alabama
Boxers from Detroit
American male boxers